The  is a minivan manufactured by Nissan, joining the slightly larger Vanette. The car was engineered by Nissan's Aichi Manufacturing Division and launched in 1991 as a compact passenger van, and it grew larger with each generation over the years. Earlier versions were front-engine, rear-wheel-drive layout with a live axle mounted on leaf springs.

Later versions had a multilink independent rear suspension, and were front-wheel drive or 4WD. The most popular version was the 2.3 L diesel engine version and it was unusual in that it had eight seats instead of the expected seven.

It is a "junior" model to the Nissan Elgrand in Japan; its name is from the Latin word "serēnus", meaning "clear, tranquil, pleasant". Its name also takes from the word , which translates into english as mermaid and offers a minivan approach in comparison to the Nissan Lafesta which is an MPV. Competitors include the Toyota Noah, the Honda Stepwgn, the Mitsubishi Delica, and formerly, the Mazda Biante.

The Serena is designed to comply with Japanese vehicle class, which means its external dimensions are restricted to 4.7 m in length and 1.7 m in width.



First generation (C23; 1991) 

Models were manufactured in Japan from 1991 onwards, and many were imported into Australasia and the United Kingdom. Nissan produced many different trim levels - FX, SX etc. Full-Auto (full-time) 4WD versions were also produced providing greater stability and better handling. The naturally aspirated 2.3 L diesel was never manufactured for the Japanese market and its seating arrangement and interior fittings are not the same as the 2.0 L petrol (SR20DE), 2.0 L diesel CD20 and turbo-diesel CD20T models manufactured in Japan for the local market. It was exclusive to Japanese Nissan dealerships called Nissan Bluebird Store.

Throughout its production the C23 model underwent several facelifts although the interior design and body largely remained unchanged, for example, addition of airbags and bench seats for the second and third rows. Each facelift model can be identified by front grille design which was updated in 1994 and 1997.

In European markets, the C23 Serena had 1.6 or 2.0 L petrols, or 2.3 L diesel engines LD23. Trim levels were LX, SLX, SGX and SGXi. Auto Express once named the Serena as the slowest passenger car in the benchmark 0-60 mph (now 62 mph) test, with the 2.3 L diesel version (added in the mid 1990s) taking 27.8 seconds to reach that speed.

Until around 2002, the standard petrol engine was an SR20DE. A variety of other engines were used over the years, including diesels specifically the CD20 (for the commercial van version), CD20T 1,973 cc Diesel Turbo, and the CD20ET.

Serena Highway Star

Europe 
The Nissan Vanette was a series of small vans manufactured in Spain by Nissan alongside the European market Serena models. The van was produced in two versions, the Vanette E, which shared the basic body shell with the Nissan Serena people carrier, differing only in not having rear windows and passenger seats, and the Vanette Cargo, which was longer and had a higher roof line from behind the front seats.

In June 1998, LDV Group entered into an agreement with Nissan to sell a rebranded version of the Vanette Cargo. This was named the LDV Cub and was sold alongside the Vanette in Britain. The model was discontinued in 2001 and replaced by a rebadged version of the Renault Trafic called the Nissan Primastar, which is produced in Luton, England and Barcelona, Spain.

Reputation 
The Nissan Serena Mk1 is said to have an image problem by some, in particular Fifth Gear presenter Quentin Willson, who remarked in a 1997 Top Gear episode that "...the Nissan Serena was about as seductive as a skip and as desirable as an old shoe."

By 2000, the Nissan Serena was described as the worst new car sale on Britain, by Top Gears Buyers Guide, with "absolutely nothing to recommend it for".

Although the Nissan Serena handles better than most people expect it to (due to its mid-mounted engine), its power-to-weight ratio is particularly poor, as shown by the 0–100 km/h averages listed below. The only models with marginally acceptable acceleration are powered by the SR20DE engine.

 Nissan Largo Largo was the model name used for a Nissan passenger van based on the C23 Serena between 1992 and 1998. Unlike the previous Largo, which was essentially a widened C22 Nissan Vanette, the W30 Largo was a totally rebodied, wider Serena with more equipment such as four-wheel-drive. It was exclusive to Nissan Satio Store locations as a large load carrying vehicle next to the Sunny. The Largo was available with either a 2.4-litre petrol or a 2.0-litre turbo-diesel, both mid engined (under the front seats).

  Second generation (C24; 1999) 

The second-generation Serena was launched in Japan in June 1999, ditched the rear-wheel drive layout in favour of front-wheel drive construction. These versions had a facelift with a wider variety of engines and colours. From December 2001 onwards (the time of the facelift) the Serena used the QR20DE and QR25DE. The pre-facelift C24 Serenas all have a 2.0 L engine, with the optional 2.5 L engine becoming available from 2002. With the partnership between Nissan and Renault having been implemented, Nissan MPVs were withdrawn from Europe where Renault products, like the Renault Espace and Renault Scénic were sold and better accepted.

Indonesian-market cars use the 2.0 L QR20DE inline-four petrol engine. The trims available in Indonesia are Comfort Touring, Highway Star, and Autech. The Comfort Touring trim-level does not come equipped with electric sliding door and reverse camera, while the Highway Star and the Autech do. The C24 Serena was also manufactured by Edaran Tan Chong Motor Sdn Bhd in Kuala Lumpur, Malaysia.

Serena Highway Star

Serena Rider

 Taiwanese version 
In Taiwan, a lengthened version of the Serena C24 has been manufactured by Yulon under the Nissan label. The Taiwanese Serena is  longer than the original, all behind the C-pillar. The Taiwanese version was in production until 2012 and only available with the  2.5-liter QR25DE engine joined to a 5-speed manual or 4-speed automatic.

 Chinese version 
In the People's Republic of China, the Serena Mk. II was sold by Zhengzhou Nissan Automobile in the form of the Taiwanese Yulon version while being rebadged to Yuxuan or Yumsun under the Dongfeng brand. 

Another restyled, rebadged, and renamed version called the Dongfeng Succe and is also produced by their subsidiary Zhengzhou Nissan Automobile.

  Third generation (C25; 2005) 

The third generation debuted in Japan in May 2005. This model was officially sold in Japan and Hong Kong, and also sold through parallel imports in Singapore, Indonesia and Brunei.

In 2007, 2008 and 2009, the Serena C25 was the best selling minivan in Japan.

This model was also sold as the Suzuki Landy in Japan, a practice that is continued with the fourth and fifth generation Serena.

The third generation was discontinued in Japan in late 2010 and in Hong Kong in 2011.

 Gallery 

  Fourth generation (C26; 2010) 

The 2011 Nissan Serena was released in late November 2010 to the Japanese market, equipped with a new 2.0-litre MR20DD direct injection inline-four gasoline engine. This model was sold in Japan, Hong Kong, Malaysia and Indonesia.

In August 2012, Nissan added their newly developed simple hybrid system called Smart Simple Hybrid or S-HYBRID. The Nissan Serena C26 S-HYBRID has its regeneration capacity and output power of the Eco Motor', which is an alternator that is used for Nissan's Serena having an idling stop mechanism and capable of restarting an engine, upgraded. Nissan added a lead sub-battery in the engine room for extended energy regeneration capacity. The Serena has a fuel economy of 15.2 km/L (approx 35.8 mpg) under the JC08 test mode.

In Indonesia, the C26 Serena was locally assembled and went on sale in January 2013. The Autech version of the Highway Star trim was added in September 2013. The facelift version of the C26 Serena was launched on 13 March 2015.

In Malaysia, Tan Chong launched Nissan Serena S-Hybrid in July 2013 being fully imported from Japan and only available in one trim level: Highway Star. In November 2014, the facelift version was launched, being locally assembled in Malaysia and available in two trim levels: Highway Star and Premium Highway Star. In July 2016, Impul versions were made available.

Gallery

Fifth generation (C27; 2016) 

Nissan unveiled the fifth generation Serena on 6 July 2016, and sales began in Japan on 24 August 2016. The all-new Serena received the ProPilot technology, which does lane centering. The system is designed for highway use, and will only be used in single-lane traffic as a means to keep a car between the lines of a lane on the highway. Propilot can follow curves, and it automatically controls the distance between the vehicle ahead.

The Serena e-Power went on sale in February 2018. It is a series hybrid with no plug-in capability powered by the HR12DE straight-three engine.

The C27 Serena debuted in Hong Kong in 2017.

In Malaysia, the C27 Nissan Serena S-Hybrid was launched on 14 May 2018 as a 7-seater locally assembled MPV and available in two trim levels: Highway Star and Premium Highway Star.

In Singapore, an e-Power powered C27 Nissan Serena was displayed during the 2019 Singapore Motor Show.

In Indonesia, the C27 Serena was launched on 19 February 2019 and is fully imported from Japan.

Facelift
The C27 Serena received a facelift in Japan on 1 August 2019 with redesigned front grille, front and rear bumpers, and omnidirectional driving support.

In Malaysia, the facelifted C27 Serena S-Hybrid was launched on 6 July 2022.

Specifications

Engines

Transmission

Sixth generation (C28; 2022) 

The sixth-generation Serena was unveiled on 28 November 2022. For the Japanese market, it is available in X, XV, Highway Star V and Luxion grade levels. The first three grades are available with either petrol or e-Power and have 8-seater capacity, while the latter is only offered with e-Power and has 7-seater capacity.

Notes

External links
Nissan page: Japan, Hong Kong (e-Power), Singapore (e-Power)

Serena
Cars introduced in 1991
2000s cars
2010s cars
2020s cars
Minivans
Rear-wheel-drive vehicles
Front-wheel-drive vehicles
All-wheel-drive vehicles
Hybrid minivans
Partial zero-emissions vehicles
Vehicles with CVT transmission
Vehicles with four-wheel steering
Euro NCAP large MPVs